Artyom Andreyevich Sarychev (born 12 June 2000) is a Russian football player.

Club career
He made his debut in the Russian Football National League for FC Mordovia Saransk on 9 March 2020 in a game against FC SKA-Khabarovsk. He started and played a full match.

References

External links
 Profile by Russian Football National League
 
 

2000 births
Living people
Russian footballers
Association football defenders
FC Mordovia Saransk players
Russian First League players